Richard Colman is an athlete.

Richard Col(e)man may also refer to:

Richard Colman (MP)
Dick Colman (Richard Whiting Colman Jr.), American football player and coach
Richard Coleman, actor
Richard Henry Coleman, organist
Richard A. Coleman Highway
Rich Coleman, Canadian politician